The 2012 South Carolina State Bulldogs football team represented South Carolina State University in the 2012 NCAA Division I FCS football season. They were led by 11th year head coach Oliver Pough and played their home games at Oliver C. Dawson Stadium. They are a member of the Mid-Eastern Athletic Conference. They finished the season 5–6, 4–4 in MEAC play to finish in a tie for sixth place.

Schedule

Source: Schedule

References

South Carolina State
South Carolina State Bulldogs football seasons
South Carolina State Bulldogs football